Jirban is a village in Hamdan District of Sanaa Governorate, Yemen. It is located on a small promontory at the foot of Jabal Din, just to the north of the road from Sanaa to 'Amran.

History 
Jirban is first mentioned in historical sources in 1302 (701 AH), in the Ghayat al-amani of Yahya ibn al-Husayn. It historically was the site of a minor fort.

References 

Villages in Sanaa Governorate